Tianzhong is a railway station on the Taiwan Railways Administration West Coast line located in Tianzhong Township, Changhua County, Taiwan.

History
The station was opened on 26 March 1905.

Service 
West Coast terminus of Taroko Express for

Around the station
 THSR Changhua Station

See also
 List of railway stations in Taiwan

References 

1905 establishments in Taiwan
Railway stations in Changhua County
Railway stations opened in 1905
Railway stations served by Taiwan Railways Administration